The Punjab States Agency was an agency of the British Raj. The agency was created in 1921, on the model of the Central India Agency and Rajputana Agency, and dealt with forty princely states in northwest India formerly dealt with by the Province of Punjab.

After 1947, all of the states chose to accede to the Dominion of India, except Bahawalpur, which acceded to the Dominion of Pakistan.

History 

The princely states had come under the suzerainty of the British crown after the Anglo-Nepalese War of 1814–16 and went on to be known as the Punjab Native States and the Simla Hill States. They later came into direct diplomatic relations with the British province of Punjab, with the exception of Tehri Garhwal State, which had a connection instead with the United Provinces.

The Punjab States Agency was established in 1921 out of the previous Punjab Native States, which had received advice from the Lieutenant Governor of Punjab Province, and the Simla Hill States, advised by the Deputy Commissioner of Simla district. The agency was created under the direct authority of the Governor General of India, with its headquarters in Shimla.

After Indian Independence in 1947, the states all acceded to the new Dominion of India, most of them later becoming part of the new state of Himachal Pradesh, with Tehri Garhwal State becoming part of Uttar Pradesh. In 2000, the northern portion of Uttar Pradesh, including the former state of Tehri-Garhwal, became the new state of Uttarakhand.

Princely states

Punjab States Agency 
Salute states, by precedence :
 Patiala, title Maharaja, Hereditary salute of 17-guns (19-guns local) 
 Bahawalpur (now in Pakistan), title Nawab, Hereditary salute of 17-guns (later promoted to 21 guns by the Pakistani president)
 Jind, title Maharaja, Hereditary salute of 13-guns (15-guns personal and local)
 Kapurthala, title Maharaja, Hereditary salute of 13-guns (15-guns personal and local)
 Nabha, title Maharaja, Hereditary salute of 13-guns (15-guns local)
 Kaithal, title Bhai ( Maharaja) Hereditary salute 13-guns (15-guns local)
 Bilaspur (Kahlur), title Raja, Hereditary salute of 11-guns 
 Chamba, title Raja, Hereditary salute of 11-guns
 Faridkot, title Raja, Hereditary salute of 11-guns
 Maler Kotla (Malerkotla), title Nawab, Hereditary salute of 11-guns 
 Mandi, title Raja, Hereditary salute of 11-guns
 Sirmur (Nahan), title Maharaja, Hereditary salute of 11-guns
 Suket (Sundarnagar), title Raja, Hereditary salute of 11-guns
 Loharu, title Nawab, Hereditary salute of 9-guns

Non-salute states, alphabetically : 
 Dujana State, title Nawab.
 Mamdot, title Nawab
 Pataudi, title Nawab

Annexed States:
 Bahadurgarh, title Nawab, annexed 1857
 Ballabgarh, title Raja, annexed 1857
 Farrukhnagar, title Nawab, annexed 1857
 Jhajjar, title Nawab, annexed 1857

Jagirs 
 Kunjpura, title Nawab
 Arnauli, title Bhai
 Karnal, title Nawab
 Shantiabad, title Sardar
 Dhanaura, title Sardar
 Tangaur, title Sardar
 Jharauli, title Sardar
 Shamgarh, title Sardar
 Panipat, title Nawab
 Shahzadapur, title Sardar
 Mustafabad, title Sardar
 Gogripur, title Chaudhary

Historical princely states of the Punjab Hills 

 Kangra
 Kangra-Nadaun
 Jaswan
 Guler (Haripur)
 Siba
 Datarpur
 Kutlehar
 Madhopur
 Nurpur, Himachal Pradesh

Simla Hill States Superintendency of the Punjab States Agency 
Salute states:
 Sirmur , title Maharaja, 11 Gun salute
 Bashahr, title Raja, Personal 9 guns-salute

Non-salute states, alphabetically: 

 Baghal
 Baghat
 Balsan
 Beja
 Bhajji
 Darkoti
 Dhami
 Jubbal
 Keonthal
 Kumharsain
 Kunihar
 Kuthar
 Mahlog
 Mangal
 Nalagarh (Hindur)
 Sangri
 Tharoch

Dynasties by State 
The following are the dynasties of respective states of the Punjab Agency:

Salute states, by precedence:
 Patiala - Sidhu Jat (Phulkian Dynasty)
 Bahawalpur - Daudpotra Abbasi
 Jind - Sidhu Jat (Phulkian Dynasty)
 Kapurthala - Kalal Jat
 Nabha - Sidhu Jat (Phulkian Dynasty)
 Bilaspur (Kahlur) - Agrok Rajput
 Chamba - Agrok Rajput
 Faridkot - Brar Jat (Phulkian Dynasty)
 Maler Kotla (Malerkotla) - Sherwani Pathan
 Mandi - Chandravansi Rajput (Lunar Race)
 Sirmur (Nahan) - Jadu Bhatti Rajput
 Suket - Chandravansi Rajput (Lunar Race)
 Loharu - Pathan

Non-salute states, alphabetically : 
 Dujana State - Yusufzai Pathan
 Mamdot - Hassanzai Pathan
 Pataudi - Barech Pathan

Annexed States:
 Bahadurgarh - Barech Pathan
 Ballabgarh - Tewatia Jat 
 Farrukhnagar - Baluch
 Jhajjar - Barech Pathan

See also 
 Political integration of India

References 

Agencies of British India
Historical Indian regions
1947 disestablishments in India
1933 establishments in India
Government agencies established in 1930